Cattleya lawrenceana is a species of labiate Cattleya orchid.

External links

lawrenceana
lawrenceana